Roger Parent may refer to:

 Roger Parent (Canadian politician) (1953–2016), former MLA in Saskatchewan
 Roger Parent (mayor), former mayor of South Bend, Indiana